Muriwai, also called Muriwai Beach, is a coastal community on the west coast of the Auckland Region in the North Island of New Zealand. The black-sand surf beach and surrounding area is a popular recreational area for Aucklanders. The Muriwai Regional Park includes a nesting site for a large colony of gannets.

The New Zealand Ministry for Culture and Heritage gives a translation of "water's end" for Muriwai.

Geology 

The Muriwai area was uplifted from the sea floor between 3 and 5 million years ago. Much of the landscape is formed by remnants of the eastern side of the Waitākere Volcano, notably the pillow lava formations seen along the cliffs south of Muriwai beach.

History 
The Muriwai area is traditionally a part of rohe of the Tāmaki Māori tribe Te Kawerau ā Maki, known originally by the name One Rangatira ("The Chiefly Beach"), referring to the tohunga Rakatāura's visit to the beach. The beach has spiritual significance to Te Kawerau ā Maki, as it is a part of Te Rerenga Wairua, the pathway that souls take to Cape Reinga to depart the world.

Te Kawerau ā Maki and Ngāti Whātua fought over the area when the latter settled south of the Kaipara Harbour. Muriwai became known as the border between Te Kawerau ā Maki and Ngāti Whātua, when peace was struct by the Te Kawerau ā Maki chief Te Hawiti / Te Au o Te Whenua. The area was settled by Ngāti Te Kahupara, a Ngāti Whātua hapū with Kawerau ancestry, until the 20th century.

The southern Muriwai Beach area was also known as Paenga Tohorā, referring to the many whale strandings that happened in the location. Te Au o Te Whenua lived at Te Korekore, a headland pā located at the south end of the beach. He was known for collecting and drying Paphies ventricosa (toheroa) collected from the Muriwai area, which he would trade with other Tāmaki Māori iwi and hapū for delicacies. The gannet colony headland was known as Ōtakamiro, the location of a pā named after the ancestor Takamiro. Other pā and villages to the south-east of the beach included Matuakore, Te Toheriri, Ngārihariha and Tirikohua. The modern name, Muriwai, means "End of the Water". It refers to the Te Muriwai, a kāinga located upstream of the beach along the Muriwai Stream/Okiritoto Stream, which over time became a name for the river valley, and eventually for the wider area.

In 1962, Muriwai became the location where the COMPAC submarine communications cable connected Auckland to Sydney, and a repeater station was installed 3km from Muriwai Beach. This was used until 5 October 1983, when a cable fault at Sydney caused the system to cease working.

Location 
Muriwai is approximately 17 km west of Kumeū, 42 kilometres northwest of Auckland city, at the southern end of an unbroken 50 kilometre stretch of beach which extends up the Tasman Sea coast to the mouth of the Kaipara Harbour.
One of several popular beaches in the area (others include Piha and Karekare), it experiences a population explosion in summer when Aucklanders head to the sea. It is in the Rodney Ward of the Auckland Region.

Governance 
Muriwai is part of the Local Government Rodney Ward of Auckland Council and is part of the Kumeu Subdivision of the Rodney Local Board. Muriwai is in the Kaipara ki Mahurangi electorate. (Previously Helensville electorate.)

Demographics 

Muriwai had a population of 1,248 at the 2018 New Zealand census, an increase of 117 people (10.3%) since the 2013 census, and an increase of 204 people (19.5%) since the 2006 census. There were 444 households, comprising 636 males and 612 females, giving a sex ratio of 1.04 males per female. The median age was 40.1 years (compared with 37.4 years nationally), with 282 people (22.6%) aged under 15 years, 165 (13.2%) aged 15 to 29, 690 (55.3%) aged 30 to 64, and 111 (8.9%) aged 65 or older.

Ethnicities were 94.2% European/Pākehā, 11.1% Māori, 2.6% Pacific peoples, 3.8% Asian, and 3.1% other ethnicities. People may identify with more than one ethnicity.

The percentage of people born overseas was 18.3, compared with 27.1% nationally.

Although some people chose not to answer the census's question about religious affiliation, 69.5% had no religion, 18.5% were Christian, 0.2% had Māori religious beliefs, 0.2% were Hindu, 0.2% were Muslim, 0.7% were Buddhist and 3.6% had other religions.

Of those at least 15 years old, 333 (34.5%) people had a bachelor's or higher degree, and 81 (8.4%) people had no formal qualifications. The median income was $45,700, compared with $31,800 nationally. 294 people (30.4%) earned over $70,000 compared to 17.2% nationally. The employment status of those at least 15 was that 552 (57.1%) people were employed full-time, 168 (17.4%) were part-time, and 33 (3.4%) were unemployed.

Activity 
 Surfing is the main pastime at Maukatia (Maori Bay) and Muriwai Beach. Other pastimes enjoyed at Maukatia include paragliding and hang gliding, especially when the prevailing southwesterly wind provides favourable conditions.
 Fishing is also popular, although dangerous in many places.
 Bush walking is encouraged, with boardwalks in place, and the 'Hilary Trail' passes through Muriwai.
 Driving along the beach is popular, especially at fishing contest time, although vehicles have been mass stranded in past years.
 Surf boards, surfing tuition and sand yachts are available for hire at the Muriwai Surf School near the beach.
 There are many mountain bike trails up in the pines, mainly downhill and freeride trails.
 The beach was used extensively for motor racing from the 1920s through to the 1940s.
 Horse riding is popular along the beach, as well as through the extensive tracks behind the sand dunes. Access is also available through the Woodhill Forest Equestrian Park.

Geology 
Sand and rock (sedimentary), older volcanic material, with many concretions and layers in the cliff walls. A blowhole plays often. The shore platform is also well jointed, with the main rock type being piha conglomerate.

Muriwai Beach has black sand, caused by the iron content derived from the ancient volcanoes in the area, including the large Kaipara Volcano which was situated offshore from the Kaipara Heads, and erupted 23-16 million years ago. The black sand is moved up the west coast of the North Island by longshore drift.

2013 shark attack

In February 2013, filmmaker Adam Strange was killed at Muriwai Beach while swimming about 200m offshore, when he was attacked by a small group of great white sharks. As a result, Muriwai Beach was closed for a number of days. Initial reports suggested the culprit was a bronze whaler, but it was later deemed more likely a great white was to blame. It was the first fatal shark attack in more than three decades in New Zealand.

References

External links

 Muriwai - community promotion
 Muriwai Regional Park
 Muriwai Volunteer Fire Brigade
  Muriwai Volunteer Lifeguard Service
 Muriwai Environmental Action Community Trust
 Hillary Trail
 Muriwai Community Association
 Photographs of Muriwai held in Auckland Libraries' heritage collections.

Surfing locations in New Zealand
Lookouts in Auckland
Beaches of the Auckland Region
Shark attacks
Populated places in the Auckland Region
Black sand beaches
West Auckland, New Zealand